Your Vice Is a Locked Room and Only I Have the Key is a 1972 giallo film directed by Sergio Martino. The picture stars Edwige Fenech, Luigi Pistilli, and Anita Strindberg. The film uses many elements from Edgar Allan Poe's 1843 short story "The Black Cat" and acknowledges this influence in the film's opening credits.

Your Vice Is a Locked Room and Only I Have the Key was Martino's fourth giallo film. The title of the film is a reference to his first one, The Strange Vice of Mrs. Wardh (Lo strano vizio della Signora Wardh, 1971),  in which the killer leaves the phrase as a note to his victim. The victim in that film was played by Fenech. The film has been released under several alternate titles, including Gently Before She Dies, Eye of the Black Cat and Excite Me!.

Plot
Oliviero Rouvigny, a failed writer and an alcoholic, lives in a crumbling mansion with his wife Irina, who is scared of Oliviero's cat, Satan, that used to belong to his late mother Esther. The only other main resident is the maid, Brenda. To fight boredom, Oliviero organizes decadent parties for local hippies and humiliates and abuses Irina in front of the guests. A key early plot-point is the elegant gown that belonged to Rouvigny's dead mother that he catches Irina wearing which angers him. After his mistress Fausta, a young student and bookstore employee, is found murdered, Oliviero becomes the primary suspect after being fingered by Fausta's  boss Bartello. The author lies when questioned by police and tells them that he was fixing a flat tire on his car during the time Fausta was murdered and forces Irina to cover for him. Later, Irina investigates the supposed flat tire in the boot of her husbands car but he catches her and angrily beats her. During the night during a heavy thunder storm, Brenda puts on Esther's gown and is silently watched by Oliviero. Brenda senses someone else is in the house and attempts to flee to her room but is mortally wounded by the still-unseen killer with a bill-hook. Irina finds the dying Brenda who collapses at her feet. Oliviero appears and coldly views the body and convinces Irina to help him conceal it to avoid further suspicions. Brenda's body is buried in the cellar, although Oliviero refuses to dispose of the blood-stained gown with the body and tells Irina to wash it. 

Then Oliviero's niece Floriana suddenly arrives for a visit from Paris. A sinister gray-haired man also appears and seems to watch the Rouvigny's from afar. Later at the house, the same gray-haired man shows up and gives Irina a dry-cleaning package containing the gown. Oliviero flies into a rage after believing his wife sent the dress out to be cleaned and beats her and locks her in a closet where Satan claws Irina. Floriana finds her aunt in the closet and frees her. Irina finds comfort in Floriana's arms and bed, and the two start an affair and decide to find a way to deal with Oliviero. The same night, the killer strikes again and murders a local prostitute named Giovanna, who had coincidentally arrived in town the same day Floriana appeared. The girl's aunt/madame kills the attacker. The following day, the police inspector reveals to Oliviero that the serial killer was none other than the book store manager Bartello, who was really an escaped mental patient named Lipori. Rouvigny tells his wife this and attempts to strangle her. Floriana, meanwhile, has begun a relationship with the local milkman Dario, who previously dated Brenda. Following attending a dirt-bike race in which Dario competes but is forced to drop-out of due to his bike failing, Floriana is taken by Dario to an old barn where they make love while Oliviero secretly spies on them. 

Irina catches Satan after the cat kills several of her pet doves and in a rage stabs one of the cats eyes out with a pair of scissors. This is witnessed by the elderly woman who collects bottles from the house and she is ordered to leave by a crazed-looking Irina who rushes into the house and collapses. Later Oliviero enters Floriana's room and finds her laying in bed in his mother's gown. Floriana reveals she knew that her uncle spied on her when she bedded Dario in the barn loft and then proceeds to seduce Oliviero. The next morning, Oliviero confronts Irina about his missing cat and questions why she bought new scissors. When Irina mentions Esther, Oliviero lunges at her and rapes her, Floriana witnessing everything. The elderly woman, Mrs. Molinar, visits the town and asks to speak to the Chief of Police regarding the Rouvigny's. Oliviero, Floriana, and Irina visit a mountaintop scenic view and the two women discuss killing Oliviero by pushing him over the cliff. That night, Irina is awakened by the sound of Satan's wailing outside. She goes to the room of Floriana and overhears her niece and Oliviero discussing her and Oliviero mentions he has made space in the cellar for his wife's body. Irina rushes outside and sees Dario secretly meeting with Floriana and asking her to meet him in the morning. Irina spies Satan and chases him into the cellar where she discovers that Brenda's corpse has been uncovered, giving credence to Oliviero's murderous plans. Irina approaches Olivero, passed out next to his typewriter and violently stabs him to death with the scissors. Following the murder, Floriana reveals she watched but indicates that Irina will surely go to prison unless she covers up the murder. Floriana reveals that she has been after the jewelry that Oliviero had stashed in the mansion. Irina humbly gives her the jewelry and the two have sex one final time before Floriana departs in the morning. The gray-haired man, Walter, sneaks into the house in the early morning hours and begins writing on Oliviero's type writer "vendetta" repeatedly before escaping as Irina and Floriana investigate. Disturbed by these events, Floriana abandons Irina and rushes out to meet Dario. Walter appears and its discovered is the secret-lover to Irina, who goes to the cellar. Irina reveals that it was she who killed Esther as well as Brenda. The original scheme was to convince Oliviero he was Brenda's killer and drive him mad, however his own plans to murder Irina and bed Floriana forced a change of plan. Walter kills both Floriana and Dario by throwing oil on the road as they attempt to escape on motorbike, making it look like an accident so he can recover the family jewels. Later, Irina pushes Walter off a cliff to have the jewelry all for herself. When Irina returns to the mansion, she finds the police there. Mrs. Molinar, the old woman, had filed a complaint for animal cruelty, as she had seen Irina stabbing Satan. Inside the mansion, the police officers notice that the cat seems to be mewing in agony inside a wall. As they tear down the wall, they discover the cat and the dead body of Oliviero inside.

Cast  
Edwige Fenech as Floriana 
Anita Strindberg as Irina 
Luigi Pistilli as Oliviero 
Ivan Rassimov as Walter
Angela La Vorgna as Brenda 
Enrica Bonaccorti as Hooker
Daniela Giordano as Fausta
Ermelinda De Felice as Madam 
Marco Mariani as Libraio 
Nerina Montagnani as Molinar 
Carla Mancini
Bruno Boschetti 
Franco Nebbia as Inspector 
Riccardo Salvino as Dario
Dalila Di Lazzaro as Stripper (uncredited)

References

External links
 .
 .

1972 films
1970s Italian-language films
1970s crime thriller films
Giallo films
Films directed by Sergio Martino
Films produced by Luciano Martino
Films scored by Bruno Nicolai
Films set in country houses
Films based on The Black Cat
Films about cats
1970s Italian films